Rare event sampling is an umbrella term for a group of computer simulation methods intended to selectively sample 'special' regions of the dynamic space of systems which are unlikely to visit those special regions through brute-force simulation.  A familiar example of a rare event in this context would be nucleation of a raindrop from over-saturated water vapour: although raindrops form every day, relative to the length and time scales defined by the motion of water molecules in the vapour phase, the formation of a liquid droplet is extremely rare.

Due to the wide use of computer simulation across very different domains, articles on the topic arise from quite disparate sources and it is difficult to make a coherent survey of rare event sampling techniques.  Contemporary methods include Transition Path Sampling (TPS), Replica Exchange Transition Interface Sampling (RETIS), Repetitive Simulation Trials After Reaching Thresholds (RESTART), Forward Flux Sampling (FFS), Generalized Splitting, Adaptive Multilevel Splitting (AMS), Stochastic Process Rare Event Sampling (SPRES), Line sampling, Subset simulation, and Weighted Ensemble (WE). The first published rare event technique was by Herman Kahn and Theodore Edward Harris in 1951, who in turn referred to an unpublished technical report by John von Neumann and Stanislaw Ulam.

Time dependence

If a system is out of thermodynamic equilibrium, then it is possible that there will be time-dependence in the rare event flux.  In order to follow the time evolution of the probability of a rare event it is necessary to maintain a steady current of trajectories into the target region of configurational space.  SPRES is specifically designed for this eventuality and AMS is also at least formally valid for applications in which this is required.

In cases where a dissipative steady state obtains (i.e. the conditions for thermodynamic equilibrium are not met, but the rare event flux is nonetheless constant) then FFS and other methods can be appropriate as well as the typically more expensive full-nonequilibrium approaches.

Landscape methods

If the assumption of thermodynamic equilibrium is made, then there is no time-dependence in the rare event flux and a thermodynamic rather than statistical approach to the problem may be more appropriate.  These methods are generally thought of separately to rare event methods, but may address the same problems. In these strategies, a free energy landscape (or an energy landscape, for small systems) is prepared.  For a small system this landscape may be mapped entirely, while for a system with a larger number of degrees of freedom a projection onto some set of progress coordinates will still be required.

Having mapped the landscape, and making certain assumptions, transition state theory can then be used to yield a description of the probabilities of paths within it.  An example method for mapping landscapes is Replica exchange simulation, which has the advantage when applied to rare event problems that piecewise correct trajectory fragments are generated in the course of the method, allowing some direct analysis of the dynamic behaviour even without generating the full landscape.

See also
 Rare events

Related software 
 R package mistral (CRAN and dev version) for rare event simulation tools
 The Python toolset freshs.org as an example toolkit for distributing FFS and SPRES calculations to run sampling trials concurrently on parallel hardware or in a distributed manner across the network.
 Pyretis, an opensource python library to perform TIS (and RETIS) simulations. It is interfaced with common software for MD GROMACS and QM/MD CP2K simulations.
 https://westpa.github.io/westpa/ and https://github.com/ADicksonLab/wepy are packages for Weighted Ensemble.
 PyVisA,  An analysis and Visualization software for path sampling outputs with the integration of machine learning based algorithms.

References

Stochastic simulation